Skillet is an American Christian rock band formed in Memphis, Tennessee, in 1996. The band currently consists of husband John Cooper (lead vocals, bass) and wife Korey Cooper (rhythm guitar, keyboards, backing vocals) along with Jen Ledger (drums, vocals) and Seth Morrison (lead guitar). The band has released eleven albums, two of which, Collide and Comatose, received Grammy nominations. Two of their albums, Comatose and Awake, are certified Platinum and Double Platinum respectively by the RIAA, while Rise and Unleashed are certified Gold . Four of their songs, "Monster", "Hero", "Awake and Alive", and "Feel Invincible", are certified Multi-Platinum (5× Platinum, 3× Platinum, and 2× Platinum respectively), while another two, "Whispers in the Dark" and "Comatose", are certified Platinum, and another four, "Rebirthing", "Not Gonna Die", "The Last Night", and "The Resistance" are certified Gold.

Skillet went through several line-up changes early in their career, leaving founder John Cooper as the only original member remaining in the band. They are known for a relentless touring schedule, which garnered them a top five ranking in the Hardest Working Bands of 2010 by Songkick.com.

Band history

Early years (1996–2002) 
Skillet formed in 1996 with two members: John Cooper, former vocalist for Tennessee progressive rock band Seraph, and Ken Steorts, former guitarist for Urgent Cry. The two bands met through touring together, but they disbanded soon after, so John and Ken's pastor encouraged them to form their own band as a side-project. They decided to name the experiment "Skillet". After, Trey McClurkin joined the band as a temporary drummer. Skillet was only together for a month when they received interest from major Christian record label ForeFront Records. In 1996, they released their demo album Right Upside Your Head. On October 29 of the same year, they released a self-titled debut Skillet. It was well-received, and the trio continued to write new material as they toured the United States.

Cooper has said the band's name was meant to be humorous, as the other founding members had already been in other bands, each with a different sound and style. The pastor of Covenant Community Church in Memphis—where the band was formed as a worship band side project—gave them their name as he felt they were like "southern cooking, where you just toss a bunch of different things into a big ol' skillet and see what it turns out like."

Skillet recorded their follow-up album throughout 1997, titled Hey You, I Love Your Soul, which was released in April 1998. Their second effort was a change in style from the band's first release. With this release, Skillet abandoned their grunge approach for a lighter alternative rock and style. Cooper's wife Korey was enlisted soon after to play keyboards live in order to alleviate his performance duties.

Shortly before the band began recording for their third album, Invincible, Steorts left to be with his family and launch Visible Music College, and Kevin Haaland joined the band as their new guitarist. Korey Cooper joined the band permanently and played keyboards for the recording of Invincible. Because of this change, the musical style on Invincible changed to a more electronic sound. Soon after the release of Invincible in early 2000, Trey McClurkin parted ways with Skillet, and Lori Peters filled the drummer's position.

The band released their first worship album and fourth album overall, Ardent Worship, in late 2000. The band kept much of their sound from Invincible on their next album Alien Youth. With little time between touring and recording, Skillet released Alien Youth on August 28, 2001, which was the first album that John Cooper took on production duties. Before the release of Alien Youth, Haaland left the band, and Ben Kasica took over on guitar.

Ardent and breakthrough (2003–2011) 

In 2003, Collide, the band's fifth studio album, was released by Ardent Records and contained the singles "Savior" and "Collide". In 2004, the rights to Collide were bought by Lava Records, an imprint of Atlantic Records. On May 25, 2004, Collide was re-released by Lava Records, with "Open Wounds" as an added track. The album was nominated for "Best Rock Gospel Album" in 2005.

Citing P.O.D. as inspiration for the musical shift on Collide, Cooper said, "Well I'm one of these song writers, everything I hear goes through my John Cooper filter of what I like and what I don't like. [...] All these things [...] have been an influence on me."

Skillet's album Comatose was released on October 3, 2006. It features the singles "Rebirthing", "Whispers in the Dark", "Comatose", "The Older I Get", "Those Nights", "The Last Night" and "Better Than Drugs". The album debuted at No. 55 on the Billboard 200 and No. 4 on the US Top Christian Albums chart.

In January 2008, Skillet announced that their drummer, Lori Peters, was retiring from the band, feeling that "it's time for her to come off of the road and start a new chapter in her life." Peters' last concert with Skillet was on December 31, 2007. However, during the 2007 Christmas season, she took the time to train Skillet's next drummer, Jen Ledger.

On October 21, 2008, Comatose Comes Alive was released; a CD/DVD combo featuring live recordings of the band's May 9, 2008, concert in Chattanooga, Tennessee. It was shown on the Gospel Music Channel on December 5, 2008. Skillet's Comatose Comes Alive CD also had a B-side with "Live Free or Let Me Die" as a single, also with five acoustic tracks which purchasers could download by inserting the CD in their computer.

The Comatose album was certified Gold and Platinum in sales by the RIAA on November 3, 2009, and May 20, 2016, respectively.

Skillet's seventh album, Awake, contains twelve songs and was released on August 25, 2009. It charted at No. 2 on the Billboard top 200 selling around 68,000 units in its first week. "Monster" was released as a single on July 14, 2009. Contrary to popular belief, John Cooper stated that "Hero" was not the album's lead single. It was, however, released as a single in March 2010. They also released a deluxe version with the extra songs "Dead Inside" and "Would It Matter", along with the original, radio edit of "Monster" that does not have the distorted growl as in the single and in the CD. A remix on "Monster" was featured on one of their popular podcasts. The song "Hero" was used in the publicizing of the first football game of the 2009 NFL season between the Pittsburgh Steelers and Tennessee Titans, and the song "Monster" was used in the episode "Jason: The Pretty-Boy Bully" on MTV's Bully Beatdown. "Monster" was the theme song for the WWE event WWE Hell in a Cell, while the song "Hero" was the theme song for WWE Tribute to the Troops and Royal Rumble 2010, as well as both songs being included on the official soundtrack for the WWE video game WWE SmackDown vs. Raw 2010. "Monster" would also become the theme song for the AHL team the Lake Erie Monsters in Cleveland, Ohio, being played in the player intros and after a Lake Erie goal, and serves as the opening theme of the Fresno Monsters of Fresno, California. "Monster" was aired at the beginning of several ACC football games on Raycom Sports during the 2009 season. In the first week of April 2010, "Monster" was released for the Rock band music store in Rock Band 2. It also tied the record for highest-charting Christian album on the Billboard 200 with Underoath's 2006 release Define the Great Line and Casting Crowns' 2007 release The Altar and the Door, as all three albums debuted at No. 2.

Skillet was nominated for six Dove Awards for the 41st Annual GMA Dove Awards. Awake was certified gold July 2, 2010. Also in 2010, Ardent released The Early Years, a collection of their songs from 1996 to 2001. On November 12, Skillet released an iTunes sessions EP consisting of songs from Comatose and Awake. "Monster" was certified gold a day later.

On February 14, 2011, Skillet officially announced that longtime lead guitarist Ben Kasica would be leaving the band. Kasica was with the band for 10 years, contributing to the albums Alien Youth, Collide, Comatose, and Awake as well as the live album Comatose Comes Alive. He played what was planned to be his last concert with the band on March 20  but returned and continued touring until a new guitarist was trained. On April 16, Seth Morrison replaced Kasica as the lead guitarist, and now tours full-time with Skillet.

Skillet announced the release of Awake and Remixed EP in early March 2011. The remixes were mainly done by Korey Cooper and Ben Kasica. On March 2, 2011, Skillet unveiled the album artwork for the album. John Cooper says the idea was conceived when Korey Cooper and Ben Kasica remixed the song Monster for their popular podcast. The four-song EP was released on March 22.

Awake was nominated for and won the "Top Christian Album" Award at the Billboard Music Awards 2011, and the song "Awake and Alive" was announced to be on the Transformers: Dark of the Moon Soundtrack in May 2011.

Continued success (2011–present)
On June 21, 2011, John posted to his Twitter account that the band rehearsed new music for the first time and that they are getting ready for a new album. At a question and answer session before a concert, John Cooper said that they would be recording a new record in January/February 2012. However, the band was then scheduled to headline the Winter Jam Tour. They planned to enter the studio at the conclusion of the Winter Jam eastern tour, approximately in May, for a release in late 2012.

In an interview with CCM Magazine, John Cooper described the new album as "a roller coaster ride". He states: "We have aggressive tracks, artsy and musical tracks, which is new territory for Skillet. A couple songs are classic American heartland anthems, and a couple songs are signature symphonic-classical rock Skillet. Guitars are dirty and edgier, with absolute shredding solos by Seth." One of the songs mentioned in the interview was titled "Salvation".

In an interview on January 26, 2013, in Beaumont, Texas, John Cooper announced that the new album, Rise, would be coming out in May 2013, but was later scheduled for a June 25, 2013, release. In an interview with NoiseCreep, John Cooper stated the first single and music video is scheduled to be released by late April. The first single from the album, "Sick of It", will be released to US Rock radio on April 23, 2013. It was later confirmed that the first single, "Sick of It", would be released on April 9, 2013. The album debuted at No.4 on the Billboard 200 and No.1 on the Top Rock Chart and Christian Album charts selling 60,000 copies in US alone during the first week of the release. On July 12, 2016, Rise was certified Gold by the RIAA. On June 21, 2013, the band released a deluxe version of the album.

The band performed the title track off Rise on the July 11, 2013, airing of Conan.

Skillet was nominated and won a Dove Award for Rock Song of the Year for their song "Sick of It".

Vital Signs, a compilation album released exclusively in Europe, was released October 13, 2014.

On February 16, 2015, Skillet announced they were writing material for a new album with recording to begin in June with a potential release in the late half of 2015 or early 2016. On April 8, 2016, Skillet released a preview of a new song, later revealed to be called "Out of Hell", on their social media pages. On May 20, 2016, the album's title, Unleashed, was announced and later was released on August 5, 2016, on Atlantic Records. A lyric video, "Feel Invincible", was also made available. On May 26, the lyric video and digital single "Stars" was released, along with a preview for another song titled "Back From the Dead". On June 6, it was announced that "Feel Invincible" was the theme song for TBS' E-League, the live video game tournament. WWE announced on July 7 that it had chosen "Feel Invincible" as an official theme for WWE Battleground. On July 8, the full version of "Back From the Dead" was made available for purchase online. On January 27, 2017, the band released a new recording of "Stars" with an acoustic style, which was included in the film, The Shack. On November 17, 2017, they released a deluxe edition, Unleashed Beyond, containing new material such as "Breaking Free", featuring Lacey Sturm and remixes of "Feel Invincible" and "The Resistance". Skillet also released a five-track EP containing remixes of "Feel Invincible". This was available to anyone who pre-ordered Unleashed Beyond from their website.

On May 5, 2019, Billboard ran an article about Skillet's upcoming album tenth studio album, Victorious, where they mentioned that the band had sold over 12 million units worldwide. The band released "Legendary" on May 7, 2019, as the first single off Victorious. On June 14, 2019, the band released two new singles: "Save Me" and "Anchor." On July 27, the band released another single: "You Ain't Ready". The album was released on August 2, 2019.

On September 20, 2019, "Legendary" was debuted as a theme song of WWE Raw.

Victorious: The Aftermath, the deluxe edition of the album, was released on September 11, 2020.

In March 2021, John Cooper received backlash concerning comments he made on the 2021 Grammys, particularly the live performance of Cardi B and Megan Thee Stallion and their song "WAP". He explained in full the context of his comments in a video made in response to the criticism.

"Surviving the Game", Skillet's first single in a year, was released on September 15, 2021, The band also announced their eleventh studio album, Dominion, which was released on January 14, 2022. This was followed by the release of three other singles: "Standing in the Storm" on November 12, 2021, "Refuge" on December 10, 2021, and the title track, "Dominion", on January 7, 2022. On December 9, 2022, Skillet released the fourth single from the album, "Psycho In My Head", and announced the deluxe edition of the album, Dominion: Day of Destiny, which was released on February 17, 2023.

Musical style 

The band's style has been described as Christian rock, Christian metal, alternative rock, hard rock, nu metal and symphonic metal. The band's eponymous debut album was characterized by its grunge influences, while their follow-up album, Hey You, I Love Your Soul was noted for "its electronic elements and industrial feel."
Their music can also be described as an aspiration; according to Cooper's idea for a perfect music is to 'unite' individuals spiritually and socially.
Allmusic reviewer James Christopher Monger described the band's musical style as a fusion of "alt-metal, hard rock, post-grunge, and soaring alternative rock," in his review for the band's 2013 album, Rise.

Touring 

In the middle of 2005, Korey Cooper took a break from performing, due to her pregnancy with their second child. Her rhythm guitar and keyboard roles were temporarily filled by two people: Andrea Winchell (who would later become the Coopers' nanny) on keys and Chris Marvin (lead singer/guitar of The Spark) on guitar.

Skillet toured with Ron Luce and Teen Mania Ministries on their Acquire The Fire Tour across the United States and Canada in 2007. When they returned, Skillet had plans to co-headline the Justice & Mercy Tour with Flyleaf, but the tour was postponed and ultimately canceled after a number of shows due to Flyleaf lead vocalist Lacey Mosley's vocal problems. They then toured with Luce's Global Expeditions program on a summer missions trip with teenagers to Mexico. In 2008, they joined Teen Mania Ministries and toured with Acquire the Fire.

Skillet joined Breaking Benjamin, Three Days Grace, and Seether on the first half of their tour in fall 2007. Then Skillet headlined their own Comatose Tour alongside Thousand Foot Krutch and traveled to approximately 30 cities. The tour started on March 28 and ran through May 11, 2008. Skillet toured again from April 2009 through June 2009 with Decyfer Down and Disciple. This tour was called Comatose Tour 2009 (essentially a second branch of the 2008 Comatose Tour). In fall of 2009, Skillet began touring with Hawk Nelson, Decyfer Down, and The Letter Black to promote Skillet's album Awake. The Awake & Alive Tour encompassed 52 cities from October through January.

Skillet appeared at the 2009 Night of Joy Christian rock festival at Disney's Hollywood Studios at Walt Disney World. This marked the band's first absence from Universal Studios Orlando's Rock the Universe in five years due to conflicting schedules. However, they were able to perform the following year, in 2010. On September 26, 2009, Skillet appeared at Awakening Music Festival in Leesburg, Virginia, alongside Jeremy Camp, Kutless, Hawk Nelson, Disciple, Decyfer Down, and others. Skillet also played at the Super Dome in New Orleans for the ELCA National Youth Gathering in 2009.

In January 2010, they toured with Puddle of Mudd and Shinedown through the East Coast of the United States. They also announced on their live chat with fans on December 5, 2009, that they would be touring with TobyMac in March and April 2010. This was later expanded upon as the "Awake Tonight Tour" named after both artists' new albums. House of Heroes joined them on the tour as the opening act. In April and May, the band continued on a second branch of their Awake and Alive tour with The Letter Black and Red. In April, it was also announced that the band would be touring with Creed and Theft in August and September 2010. In October, the band would be co-headlining the "Monsters of Annihilation Tour" with Papa Roach. Trapt and My Darkest Days will be supporting acts. They toured again with TobyMac in November and December as the 2010 version of the Winter Wonder Slam tour. On July 4, Skillet played at Creation Festival East, and John Cooper called it the best show of Skillet's career.

In January 2011, Skillet confirmed that they would be touring with Stone Sour and Theory of a Deadman on the Avalanche Tour. The tour began at the end of March 2011 and concluded on May 8 in Jacksonville, FL. Other supporting acts include Halestorm and Art of Dying. The band had a small international tour in January and February 2011 visiting Australia, New Zealand's Parachute Music Festival, and Japan. In October 2011, the band continued their Awake and Alive tour with Disciple, We as Human, and Manafest.

Skillet headlined the Winter Jam Tour 2012 for the central and eastern parts of the United States.

Starting on August 13, 2013, Skillet toured with Shinedown, Papa Roach, and In This Moment on the Carnival of Madness Tour. In October and November, the band arrives Europe supporting Nickelback's tour in 21 shows. The band closed the year headlining their own tour in Russia and a show in Ukraine.

Skillet started co-headlining the Roadshow 2014 with Third Day during January and February. Upon completion, the band continued coheadlining alongside Third Day in a spring tour. Later in May, toured with TobyMac and Lecrae in the Summer Shed Tour. Starting in the end of May, the band traveled to be part of European festivals during six weeks. In August and September, they joined Godsmack, Seether, and Buckcherry in the Rockstar Uproar Festival in twenty one American cities. In October and November, the band had its own tour in Europe and Russia, offering 22 shows.

Starting January 2, 2015, they co-headlined the Winter Jam Tour 2015 in the central and eastern part of the United States alongside Jeremy Camp. They were also part of the Winter Jam Tour 2015 West Coast.

On May 11, 2016, Skillet announced a European tour from May 28 through July 3 including Rock am Ring. In July, it was announced that Skillet would be going on a headlining Unleashed Tour with Sick Puppies, Thousand Foot Krutch, and Devour the Day, playing at club-sized venues in 18 cities primarily located along the East Coast of the United States to take place during September and October 2016. In December 2016, a 27-city, second leg of the tour was announced. Opening for Skillet on this second leg were Sick Puppies and Devour the Day.

In 2017, Skillet opened for Korn and Stone Sour on the second half of The Serenity of Summer Tour which started in Syracuse, New York on July 19 and finished in Cleveland, Ohio August 2. Starting November 5, 2017, Skillet headlined on the Air1 Positive Hits Tour across the central United States.

In 2018, Skillet headlined the Winter Jam tour for the third time, making it their fourth appearance to date. In January 2018, Skillet, along with For King & Country announced the "joy. UNLEASHED" tour in April 2018, hitting a handful of mid-western and southern US cities.

In 2019, Skillet had a 20-city US tour with Sevendust from August 11 through September 7, 2019. They will also be on tour in the US with Alter Bridge, with a stop in Toronto and Quebec..

In 2021, Skillet headlined the Drive-in Theater Tour with support from Colton Dixon and Jordan Feliz.

In 2022, Skillet headlined the Winter Jam tour for the fourth time.

Other projects 
In April 2018, Jen Ledger began pursuit of her solo career by joining with Korey Cooper. They formed as Ledger and released a self-titled EP, along with a new single "Not Dead Yet".

In September 2018, John Cooper and Seth Morrison formed a new side project, Fight the Fury. Alongside John Panzer III and Jared Ward, they released an EP, Still Breathing, with a new single, "My Demons".

Band members 

Current
 John Cooper – lead vocals, bass, acoustic guitar (1996–present); keyboards (1996–1999)
 Korey Cooper – rhythm guitar, keyboards, synthesizers, backing vocals (1999–present)
 Jen Ledger – drums, backing and occasional lead vocals (2008–present)
 Seth Morrison – lead guitar (2011–present); backing vocals (2019–present)

Former
 Ken Steorts – guitars (1996–1999)
 Kevin Haaland – lead guitar (1999–2001)
 Ben Kasica – lead guitar (2001–2011)
 Jonathan Salas – lead guitar (2011) 
 Trey McClurkin – drums (1996–2000)
 Lori Peters – drums (2000–2008)

Current touring and session musicians
 Tate Olsen – cello (2008–present)

Former touring and session musicians
 Billy Dawson – guitars (2000)
 Chris Marvin – guitars, backing vocals (2002–2003, 2005–2006)
 Faith Stern – keyboards, backing vocals (2002–2003)
 Andrea Winchell – keyboards (2005–2006)
 Scotty Rock – bass (2009–2011)
 Jonathan Chu – violin (2008–2016)
 Drew Griffin – violin (2017)
 Lacey Sturm – vocals (several dates in 2019, filling in for Ledger's singing duties as she was off with her solo project under the moniker Ledger)
 Jarob Bramlett – drums (several dates in 2019, filling in for Ledger's drumming duties as she was off with her solo project under the moniker Ledger)

Timeline

Discography 

 Studio albums
 Skillet (1996)
 Hey You, I Love Your Soul (1998)
 Invincible (2000)
 Alien Youth (2001)
 Collide (2003)
 Comatose (2006)
 Awake (2009)
 Rise (2013)
 Unleashed (2016)
 Victorious (2019)
 Dominion (2022)

Awards and recognition 

Skillet was recognized on February 1, 2016, as having recorded the biggest digital single in the history of Christian music since their song "Monster" had garnered over 2.6 million sales. It was certified 2× Platinum by the RIAA, was the number one streaming Christian song of 2015, and was the number eight streaming rock song of 2015. On their site in 2019, Skillet announced the RIAA had certified "Monster" 3× Platinum and "Hero" 2× Platinum. The article also stated that "Monster" had over 3 billion global audio streams, while "Hero" hit more than 1 billion.

References

External links 

 
 Skillet on Spotify
 

Atlantic Records artists
Lava Records artists
Fair Trade Services artists
ForeFront Records artists
Warner Music Group artists
Alternative rock groups from Tennessee
American alternative metal musical groups
American Christian metal musical groups
American nu metal musical groups
American symphonic metal musical groups
Christian rock groups from Tennessee
American Christian rock groups
Hard rock musical groups from Tennessee
Heavy metal musical groups from Tennessee
Musical groups from Memphis, Tennessee
Musical groups established in 1996
Musical quartets